S. Ramanathan may refer to
 S. Ramanathan (politician) (1895–1970)
 S. Ramanathan (musician) (1917–1988)
 S. Ramanathan (film director)  (1929–2013)
 S. R. Nathan (1924–2016)